The SGB Premiership 2021 was the 86th season of the top division, called the SGB Premiership, of the British speedway championship in 2021. Six teams participated.

Team changes
Changes from the 2019 league season saw the Swindon Robins (the 2019 champions) not fielding a team due to the uncertainty surrounding the Swindon Stadium. The Poole Pirates dropped down to the next league down, the SGB Championship but Sheffield Tigers joined the league after previously competing in the SGB Championship 2019. 

The league started on 17 May and race meetings were covered by Eurosport. Peterborough Panthers finished top of the regular season table by just one point, overtaking the long time leaders Wolverhampton Wolves. By virtue of finishing top they elected to play Wolves in the play off semi finals rather than the third or fourth placed teams Belle Vue and Sheffield. Peterborough then deservedly won the playoffs by beating Wolverhampton in the semifinals and Belle Vue in the final.

Regular season

A Fixtures

B Fixtures

League scoring system
Home loss by any number of points = 0
Home draw = 1
Home win by any number of points = 3
Away loss by 7 points or more = 0
Away loss by 6 points or less = 1
Away draw = 2
Away win by between 1 and 6 points = 3
Away win by 7 points or more = 4

Play-offs

Draw

Home team scores are in bold
Overall aggregate scores are in red

Grand final
First leg

Second leg

Teams & final averages

Belle Vue Aces

 9.52
 7.83
 7.09
 7.07
 6.94
 5.92
 4.41
 4.00

Ipswich Witches

 8.49
 7.36
 6.77
 5.75
 5.57
 5.29
 4.96
 3.95
 1.33

King's Lynn Stars

 8.62
 6.48
 6.46
 5.85
 5.78
 5.40
 5.35
 5.30
 4.59
 3.93
 3.40
 3.20
 2.80

Peterborough Panthers

 8.73
 8.04
 7.92
 7.71
 7.56
 7.14
 3.41

Sheffield Tigers

 9.44
 8.81
 8.31
 7.03
 7.00
 6.29
 4.67
 3.87
 3.38
 2.67

Wolverhampton Wolves

 8.94
 8.15
 8.06
 7.96
 7.63
 3.85
 5.93
 2.40

Knockout Cup
It was announced that the Premiership Supporters Cup would not be held during 2021.

See also
List of United Kingdom speedway league champions
Knockout Cup (speedway)

References

SGB Premiership
SGB Premiership
SGB Premiership